Sebastián Rincón Lucumí (born 14 January 1994) is a Colombian professional footballer who plays as a right winger or forward in Lithuania for FK Panevėžys.

Career
Rincón started his professional career as a teenager in 2010 with Colombian first-division club Independiente Santa Fe, before moving to Uruguayan club CA Atenas.

Rincón was loaned to Major League Soccer team Portland Timbers on 16 April 2012.

Rincón made his professional debut on 30 May 2013 in a US Open Cup game against Wilmington Hammerheads. He would go on to earn 13 caps and 2 goals for USL Championship side Portland Timbers 2 during his tenure in Portland.

On 9 July 2021, Argentine club Huracán announced the signing of Rincón. On 6 February 2022, he moved to fellow league club, Barracas Central.

Personal life
Rincón is the son of the Colombian international footballer Freddy Rincón, who played for European teams such as Real Madrid and Napoli, and also in the Colombia national team. He has a younger step brother, Andres Caceres, who plays for Miramar United Elite FC.

References

External links
 

1994 births
Living people
Colombian footballers
Footballers from Cali
Association football wingers
Association football forwards
Independiente Santa Fe footballers
Atenas de San Carlos players
Portland Timbers players
Club Atlético Tigre footballers
Vitória S.C. players
Aldosivi footballers
Club Atlético Sarmiento footballers
Club Atlético Huracán footballers
Barracas Central players
Liga Portugal 2 players
Primeira Liga players
Argentine Primera División players
Colombian expatriate footballers
Colombian expatriate sportspeople in Argentina
Expatriate footballers in Argentina
Colombian expatriate sportspeople in the United States
Expatriate soccer players in the United States
Colombian expatriate sportspeople in Portugal
Expatriate footballers in Portugal